Sergei Pavlovich Mikhailov (born 13 July 1963) is a former Russian professional footballer.

Club career
Mikhailov began his career with PFC CSKA Moscow, but did not appear in any Soviet Top League matches for the club. He played in the Soviet Second League with FC Dynamo Bryansk and FC Arsenal Tula.

References

Soviet footballers
Soviet expatriate footballers
Russian footballers
Russian expatriate footballers
Expatriate footballers in Poland
Motor Lublin players
1963 births
Living people
Russian expatriate sportspeople in Poland
FC Arsenal Tula players
Association football defenders
PFC CSKA Moscow players
FC Dynamo Bryansk players